Othello is a 1922 German silent historical romantic drama film directed by Dimitri Buchowetzki, and starring Emil Jannings, Werner Krauss and Ica von Lenkeffy. It was based on William Shakespeare's play The Tragedy of Othello, the Moor of Venice, the first of six major film adaptations of the work. It was shot at the Johannisthal Studios in Berlin. The film's sets were designed by the art director Karl Machus.

Cast
 Emil Jannings as Othello
 Werner Krauss as Iago
 Ica von Lenkeffy as Desdemona
 Theodor Loos as Cassio
 Ferdinand von Alten as Rodrigo
 Friedrich Kühne as Brabantio
 Magnus Stifter as Montano
 Lya De Putti as Emilia
 Ludwig Rex

Home media
The film was released on DVD on 19 June 2001.

References

Bibliography
 Hadfield, Andrew. A Routledge Literary Sourcebook on William Shakespeare's Othello. Routledge, 2003.
 Kreimeier, Klaus. The Ufa Story: A History of Germany's Greatest Film Company, 1918–1945. University of California Press, 1999.

External links

1922 films
1920s historical drama films
Films of the Weimar Republic
German historical drama films
German silent feature films
Films directed by Dimitri Buchowetzki
Films based on Othello
Films set in the 16th century
Films set in Venice
Films set in Cyprus
German black-and-white films
German films based on plays
Blackface minstrel shows and films
UFA GmbH films
1922 drama films
Silent drama films
1920s German films
Films shot at Johannisthal Studios
1920s German-language films